, stylized as TOTO, previously known as Toyo Toki, is a Japanese multinational toilet manufacturer which is known for manufacturing the Washlet (as well as the Warmlet and similar products). TOTO was founded in 1917. The company is based in Kitakyushu, Japan, and owns production facilities in nine countries. The name "Toto" is an abbreviation of the two Japanese words forming its full name, .

Toto acquired the German toilet manufacturer Pagette in 2009 and has been supplying the European market through this company since it first appeared at the 2009 International Sanitary and Heating Fair. The company has had its European headquarters in Düsseldorf since 2012. The pre-wall specialist Tece from Emsdetten manufactures the modules for the toilets.

Washlet 
The  is a toilet seat that features an integrated bidet. The bidet feature activates at the push of a button on the seat or a remote control; a small wand extends from the back of the rim and begins to jet water towards the backside of the user. Different Washlet models have features such as air fresheners, seat heaters, and dryers.

Expansion  
They expanded their business globally. In 2019, they opened a new branch Tilottoma Bangla Group in Dhaka, Bangladesh, Asia.

See also 
Toilets in Japan

References

External links 
 

Manufacturing companies established in 1917
Companies based in Fukuoka Prefecture
Ceramics manufacturers of Japan
Bathroom fixture companies
Japanese porcelain
Companies listed on the Tokyo Stock Exchange
Japanese companies established in 1917
Japanese brands